Mixed team curling at the 2012 Winter Youth Olympics was held from January 14 to 18 at the Innsbruck Exhibition Centre in Innsbruck, Austria.

Teams
The teams are listed as follows.

Red Group

Blue Group

Round-robin standings

Round-robin results
All draw times are listed in Central European Time (UTC+01).

Red Group

Saturday, January 14
Due to an electrical issue that affected the curling ice, Draw 1 for the Red Group has been moved to Tuesday, January 17 at 16:00.

Draw 2
16:00

Sunday, January 15
Draw 3
9:00

Draw 4
16:00

Monday, January 16
Draw 5
9:00

Draw 6
16:00

Tuesday, January 17
Draw 7
9:00

Draw 1
16:00

Blue Group

Saturday, January 14
Draw 1
12:30

Draw 2
19:30

Sunday, January 15
Draw 3
12:30

Draw 4
19:30

Monday, January 16
Draw 5
12:30

Draw 6
19:30

Tuesday, January 17
Draw 7
12:30

Tiebreaker
Tuesday, January 17, 19:30

Playoffs

Quarterfinals
Wednesday, January 18, 9:00

Semifinals
Wednesday, January 18, 13:00

Bronze medal game
Wednesday, January 18, 17:00

Gold medal game
Wednesday, January 18, 17:00

References

External links
Innsbruck 2012 – Curling Home

2012 in curling
Curling at the 2012 Winter Youth Olympics
Olympics